An associate justice of the Supreme Court of the United States is any member of the Supreme Court of the United States other than the chief justice of the United States. The number of associate justices is eight, as set by the Judiciary Act of 1869.

Article II, Section 2, Clause 2 of the Constitution of the United States grants plenary power to the president to nominate, and with the advice and consent (confirmation) of the Senate, appoint justices to the Supreme Court. Article III, Section 1 of the Constitution effectively grants life tenure to associate justices, and all other federal judges, which ends only when a justice dies, retires, resigns, or is removed from office by impeachment.

Each Supreme Court justice has a single vote in deciding the cases argued before it, and the chief justice's vote counts no more than that of any other justice; however, the chief justice leads the discussion of the case among the justices. Furthermore, the chief justice—when in the majority—decides who writes the court's opinion; otherwise, the senior justice in the majority assigns the writing of a decision. The chief justice also has certain administrative responsibilities that the other justices do not and is paid slightly more ($286,700 per year as of 2022, compared to $274,200 per year for an associate justice).

Associate justices have seniority in order of the date their respective commissions bear, although the chief justice is always considered to be the most senior justice. If two justices are commissioned on the same day, the elder is designated the senior justice of the two. Currently, the senior associate justice is Clarence Thomas. By tradition, when the justices are in conference deliberating the outcome of cases before the Supreme Court, the justices state their views in order of seniority. The senior associate justice is also tasked with carrying out the chief justice's duties when he is unable to, or if that office is vacant. Historically, associate justices were styled "Mr. Justice" in court opinions and other writings. The title was shortened to "Justice" in 1980, a year before Sandra Day O'Connor became the first female justice.

Current associate justices
There are currently eight associate justices on the Supreme Court. The justices, ordered by seniority, are:

Retired associate justices
An associate justice who leaves the Supreme Court after attaining the age and meeting the service requirements prescribed by federal statute may retire rather than resign. After retirement, they keep their title, and by custom may also keep a set of chambers in the Supreme Court building, and employ law clerks. The names of retired associate justices continue to appear alongside those of the active justices in the bound volumes of Supreme Court decisions. Federal statute provides that retired Supreme Court justices may serve—if designated and assigned by the chief justice—on panels of the U.S. courts of appeals, or on the U.S. district courts. Retired justices are not, however, authorized to take part in the consideration or decision of any cases before the Supreme Court (unlike other retired federal judges who may be permitted to do so in their former courts); neither are they known or designated as a "senior judge". When, after his retirement, William O. Douglas attempted to take a more active role than was customary, maintaining that it was his prerogative to do so because of his senior status, he was rebuffed by Chief Justice Warren Burger and admonished by the whole Court.

There are currently four living retired associate justices: Sandra Day O'Connor, retired January 31, 2006; David Souter, retired June 29, 2009; Anthony Kennedy, retired July 31, 2018; and Stephen Breyer, retired June 30, 2022. Souter has served on panels of the First Circuit Courts of Appeals following his retirement, while O'Connor also served on panels of various circuit courts for several years following her retirement and prior to her later withdrawal from public life; Kennedy and Breyer have not performed any judicial duties since retiring.

List of associate justices
Since the Supreme Court was established in 1789, the following 104 persons have served as an associate justice:

Notes

References

Further reading

External links
 Historic Supreme Court Decisionsby Justice, Legal Information Institute, Cornell University Law School
 Supreme Court of the United States (website home page)

Supreme Court of the United States people
United States federal judges
Legal professions